Horyszów  (formerly Horyszów Ruski) is a village in the administrative district of Gmina Miączyn, within Zamość County, Lublin Voivodeship, in eastern Poland.

The village has an approximate population of 650.

Notable people
 Felix Horetzky (1796–1870), composer and guitarist, was born here.

References

Villages in Zamość County